Mathias Middelberg (born 14 December 1964) is a German lawyer and politician of the Christian Democratic Union (CDU) who has been serving as a member of the Bundestag from the state of Lower Saxony since 2009.

Early career 
From 1997 until 2000, Middelberg served as chief of staff to the State Minister for Economic Affairs of Bremen, Josef Hattig.

Political career 
Middelberg first became a member of the Bundestag in the 2009 German federal election. He was a member of the Finance Committee before joining the Committee for Home Affairs from 2018 until 2021. He has since been serving as his parliamentary group's spokesperson on home affairs.

In the negotiations to form a coalition government under the leadership of Chancellor Angela Merkel following the 2017 federal elections, Middelberg was part of the working group on economic policy, led Thomas Strobl, Alexander Dobrindt and Brigitte Zypries.

In 2021 elections, he lost his constituency to Manuel Gava of the SPD, but was re-elected on the state list. Since then Middelberg has been serving as one his parliamentary group's deputy chairs, under the leadership of chair Ralph Brinkhaus. In this capacity, he oversees the group’s legislative activities on financial policy.

On behalf of his parliamentary group, Middelberg led negotiations with cabinet members Christian Lindner, Christine Lambrecht and Annalena Baerbock in May 2022 on securing a two-thirds majority in parliament needed to change Germany’s constitution to allow for a credit-based special defense fund of 100 billion euros ($107.35 billion) proposed after Russia's invasion of Ukraine.

Other activities 
 Memorial to the Murdered Jews of Europe Foundation, Member of the Board of Trustees 
 New Synagogue of Berlin, Member of the Board of Trustees
 German Federal Environmental Foundation (DBU), Member of the Board of Trustees

Political positions
In June 2017, Middelberg voted against his parliamentary group's majority and in favor of Germany's introduction of same-sex marriage.

References

External links 

  
 Bundestag biography 

1964 births
Living people
Members of the Bundestag for Lower Saxony
Members of the Bundestag 2021–2025
Members of the Bundestag 2017–2021
Members of the Bundestag 2013–2017
Members of the Bundestag 2009–2013
Members of the Bundestag for the Christian Democratic Union of Germany